Podandrogyne is a genus of flowering plants in the family Cleomaceae. They are closely related to genus Cleome.

Species include:
Podandrogyne brevipedunculata Cochrane
Podandrogyne caucana
Podandrogyne cernua	
Podandrogyne chiriquensis	
Podandrogyne chocoensis	
Podandrogyne coccinea
Podandrogyne decipiens
Podandrogyne densiflora
Podandrogyne formosa
Podandrogyne glabra
Podandrogyne gracilis	
Podandrogyne hispidula
Podandrogyne jamesonii (Briq.) Cochrane
Podandrogyne mathewsii
Podandrogyne trichopus (Benth.) H.H.Iltis & Cochrane

References

Cleomaceae
Brassicales genera
Taxonomy articles created by Polbot